The Butaca Theater Awards of Catalonia (full Catalan name: Premis Butaca de teatre de Catalunya, short form: Butaca Awards, i.e. Premis Butaca) are annual theater awards judged by popular vote existing since 1995 in Catalonia to reward those who have made valuable contributions to Catalan theater.

Spirit, Aims and Inner Workings 
They were designed as the first awards granted by popular vote and as such, are exclusively the product of audience votes. The idea was to create awards that were direct and honest, unfettered by manipulation by interested parties. They also aimed to legitimate the audience's opinion. Any productions (in any language) debuting in Catalonia are eligible. These awards are considered very prestigious in Catalonia.

There are currently (in 2016) 19 categories for the award.

The nominations are done by a committee of people who have neither direct nor indirect connections to the world of theater and have to have attended at least 36 productions during the season.

History 
The Butaca Awards were created by initiative of the Radio program called "Des de la butaca" (From the butaca, where butaca refers to a seat in a theater), on Ràdio Premià de Mar, a radio station from the coastal town of Premià de Mar. Every three years, the awards ceremony takes place in Premià de Mar, but is otherwise itinerant.

Until 2010, they were called Premis Butaca de teatre i cinema de Catalunya (Butaca Theater and Film Awards of Catalonia) and, though they were mainly for theater, included awards for cinema as well (three categories, plus an honor award). They have since exclusively focused on theater. Also in 2010, two new categories emerged: Best Theater Production made in Spain and Best Foreign Production (performed in Catalonia during the season) but were merged into one (Best Spanish or Foreign Production) in the 2012 edition.

Past Ceremonies 
The following is a listing of a few editions of the Butaca Awards, though only indicating the winner of the Best Theater Production.

References

External links
 (in Catalan)

Catalan awards
Spanish film awards
Cinema of Catalonia